USS Herkimer (AK-188) was an  that served the US Navy during the final months of World War II. Post-war she served in the Pacific Ocean theatre of operations for some time with the US Army as USAT Herkimer, and then as USNS Herkimer (T-AK-188), with the Military Sea Transportation Service (MSTS) from 1950 to 1973. She was then transferred to the navy of the Trust Territory of the Pacific Islands (TTPI).

Construction
Herkimer was laid down under U.S. Maritime Commission contract, MC hull 2119, by Walter Butler Shipbuilders, Inc., Superior, Wisconsin, 10 April 1944; launched 2 July 1944; sponsored by Miss Ann Farley; acquired by the Navy 25 June 1945 ; and commissioned at New Orleans, Louisiana, 14 July 1945.

Service history

World War II-related service
After shakedown in the Gulf of Mexico, Herkimer loaded cargo at Gulfport, Mississippi, then departed 22 August for the Western Pacific Ocean. She reached Subic Bay, Luzon, 7 October; unloaded refrigerated cargo; and sailed the 13th carrying US Army equipment for occupation forces stationed in Japan.

She arrived Sasebo, Japan, 20 October and operated there until 30 December when she departed for Yokosuka. Following her arrival 2 January 1946, she was stripped of Navy gear. She then steamed to Yokohama 16 January, decommissioned 1 February, and transferred to the US Army.

US Army service
Herkimer was operated by a Japanese merchant crew for the Supreme Commander of Allied Forces in Japan until 1 July 1950 when she was reacquired by the US Navy. After refitting, she was assigned to the MSTS 28 February 1951, and designated T-AK 188.

Korean War support
Manned by a civilian crew, she participated in the Korean supply run from Japan supporting the repulse of Communist aggression in South Korea. Operating out of Moji, Kure, and Yokohama, she transported vital military cargo to American-held South Korean ports during the remainder of the conflict.

Following the 1953 Armistice in Korea, Herkimer continued supply runs between Japan and South Korea. In response to the scheduled transfer of North Vietnam to Communist control, she departed Yokohama 6 November 1954 to provide support for Operation Passage to Freedom. She reached Haiphong, North Vietnam, 15 November; and during the next 2 months she transported cargo southward to St. Jacques and Saigon. After completing three runs to South Vietnamese ports, she departed Saigon 23 January 1955 and arrived Kobe, Japan, 1 February.

Resuming cargo runs out of Japanese ports, Herkimer remained in the Western Pacific since 1955. Cargo operations have sent her primarily to Inchon, Pusan, and other South Korean ports; and she has made numerous cargo runs along the Japanese coast from Wakkanai and Hakodate, Hokkaido, to Kagoshima and Nagasaki, Kyūshū. In addition she has steamed from Korea to Southeast Asia while supporting America's determination to maintain peace and contain Communism in the Far East. She has steamed from ports in Japan and the Philippine Islands, transporting military supplies to Formosa between 1961 and 1965.

Vietnam War
In response to American efforts to support South Vietnam, she resumed intermittent cargo runs to South Vietnam in February 1962. She remained in the Western Pacific, serving the forces of freedom in the Far East as a veteran carrier of vital military cargo.

Decommissioning 
Herkimer continued to support MSTS operations in the Pacific theatre until 15 July 1973 when she was placed out of service and struck from the Navy List.

Merchant service
She was then loaned, 15 July 1973, to the Department of the Interior (DOI) for use in the TTPI. On 31 April 1982, she was permanently transferred to the DOI for continued use in the TTPI. The ship was scrapped in November 1984.

Notes 

Citations

Bibliography 

Online resources

External links

 

Alamosa-class cargo ships
Herkimer County, New York
Ships built in Superior, Wisconsin
1944 ships
World War II auxiliary ships of the United States
Ships of the United States Army
Korean War auxiliary ships of the United States
Vietnam War auxiliary ships of the United States
Ships transferred from the United States Navy to the Trust Territory of the Pacific Islands